The Journal-Register was a three-day (Monday, Wednesday, Friday) evening daily newspaper published in Medina, New York, United States, and covering several towns and villages of Orleans County. It was owned by Greater Niagara Newspapers, a division of Community Newspaper Holdings Inc.

Formed from the 1970 merger of the Daily Journal (1903) and the Medina Register, the paper ceased publication at the end of May 2014.

References

External links
 The Journal-Register Website
 CNHI Website

Daily newspapers published in New York (state)
Orleans County, New York
Publications established in 1821